Whitaker Ponds Nature Park is a park located in northeast Portland, Oregon. The park is maintained by Portland Parks & Recreation and volunteers from the Columbia Slough Watershed Council.

See also

 List of parks in Portland, Oregon

References

1998 establishments in Oregon
Cully, Portland, Oregon
Parks in Portland, Oregon
Protected areas established in 1998